The Jackson County School Board is the school district of Jackson County, Florida. Its headquarters are in Marianna.

Board members 
Superintendent: Steve Benton
District 1: Diane Long
District 2: Tony Pumphrey
District 3: Stacey Goodson
District 4: Chris Johnson
District 5: Charlotte Gardner
Board Attorney: Matt Fuqua

Schools

Secondary
 Marianna High School (Bulldog) (9–12)
 Graceville High School (Tiger) (6–12)
 Sneads High School (Pirate) (9–12)
 Cottondale High School (Hornet)
Grand Ridge School (Grades 5–8)

Elementary
  Cottondale Elementary School  
 Graceville Elementary School
 Sneads Elementary School

Combined
Malone School (K–12)
Marianna K-8

Closed schools
In August 2020, three Marianna schools were closed and combined to create the Marianna K-8 School.

Golson Elementary, Grades K-2
Riverside Elementary, Grades 3-5
Marianna Middle School, Grades 6-8

Other Closed Schools
Jackson Academy of Applied Technology
Jackson County Training School (school for black students during segregation)

References

See Also
Cottonwood High School official website

School districts in Florida
Education in Jackson County, Florida